Dahuasan Road is a station on Line 7 of the Shanghai Metro.

This station is the thirteenth station on the line, and began operation on December 5, 2009. It is located in the Baoshan District of Shanghai, at the junction of Hualin Road and Dahua No. 3 Road.

Railway stations in Shanghai
Line 7, Shanghai Metro
Shanghai Metro stations in Baoshan District
Railway stations in China opened in 2009